The South African national cricket team visited Zimbabwe in February 1992 and played a Limited Overs Internationals (LOI) against the Zimbabwean national cricket team. South Africa won the match by six wickets. South Africa were captained by Kepler Wessels and Zimbabwe by David Houghton. It was the first-ever international match between the two countries in Zimbabwe.

One Day Internationals (ODIs)

Only match

References

External links

1992 in South African cricket
1992 in Zimbabwean cricket
South African cricket tours of Zimbabwe
International cricket competitions from 1991–92 to 1994
Zimbabwean cricket from 1980–81 to 1999–2000